Lieutenant-Colonel John Wingfield Malcolm, 1st Baron Malcolm of Poltalloch,  (16 April 1833 – 6 March 1902) was a British soldier and Conservative politician.

Background and education
Malcolm was the son of John Malcolm, 14th feudal baron of Poltalloch, Argyll, and Isabella Harriet, daughter of John Wingfield. He was educated at Eton and Christ Church, Oxford.

Political career
Malcolm was elected Member of Parliament for Boston in 1860, resigning in 1878 by becoming Steward of the Manor of Northstead. He was later Member of Parliament for Argyllshire from 1885 to 1892. He was appointed a Companion of the Order of the Bath in 1892 and raised to the peerage as Baron Malcolm of Poltalloch, in the County of Argyll, in 1896.

He was a Captain of the Kent Artillery Militia and Honourable Colonel of the 5th Voluntary Battalion, Argyll and Sutherland Highlanders.

In 1870 Malcolm played football for Scotland in the first unofficial England v Scotland International. He was one of two sitting MPs to play for Scotland in this match, the other being William Henry Gladstone.

Personal life
Lord Malcolm married firstly the Honourable Alice Frederica Irby, daughter of George Irby, 4th Baron Boston, in 1861. After her death in October 1896 he married secondly Marie Jane Lilian, widow of H. Gardner Lister, in 1897. Both marriages were childless.

He died at Hyères, France, on 6 March 1902, aged 68, when the barony became extinct. He left his estate to his younger brother Colonel Edward Donald Malcolm (1837–1930), who also succeeded as Laird of Poltalloch. The latter's son was Conservative politician Sir Ian Malcolm (1868–1944).

Lady Malcolm of Poltalloch remained a widow until her death in August 1927.

References

External links 
 

1833 births
1902 deaths
Conservative Party (UK) MPs for English constituencies
Members of the Parliament of the United Kingdom for Scottish constituencies
Scottish Tory MPs (pre-1912)
UK MPs 1859–1865
UK MPs 1865–1868
UK MPs 1868–1874
UK MPs 1874–1880
UK MPs 1886–1892
UK MPs who were granted peerages
Barons in the Peerage of the United Kingdom
People educated at Eton College
Alumni of Christ Church, Oxford
Companions of the Order of the Bath
England v Scotland representative footballers (1870–1872)
Conservative Party (UK) hereditary peers
Association footballers not categorized by position
Peers of the United Kingdom created by Queen Victoria
Association football players not categorized by nationality